The Russo-Kazan War of 1505-07 was one of the Russo-Kazan Wars.  It began when the Kazan khan looted Russian merchants at the annual Kazan trade fair. Russia sent an army which was defeated. The matter was settled by treaty in 1507 and peace lasted until 1521.

In 1502 Russia placed on the Kazan throne its protégé Mohammad Amin (r1502-18).  He married the widow of his half-brother khan Ilham Ghali of Kazan (r 1479-87) who had been deposed by the Russians and exiled to Vologda. It is said that she turned her husband against the Russians. One of his first acts was to put to death Kel Akhmed, the leader of the pro-Russian faction. In June 1505 Mohammad Amin arrested the Russian ambassador and plundered the Russian merchants who had gathered for the annual trade fair. Those merchants who were not killed were held either for ransom or for sale as slaves.  Expecting vengeance, Mohammad sent 40000 Tartars and 20000 Nogais against Nizhny Novgorod and Murom. The Murom force seems to have been driven away. Nizhny Novgorod was short of troops so the commander freed and armed 300 prisoners from the Lithuanian war. This was enough to save the fort. The Nogai chief, who was Mohammad’s brother-in-law, was killed. The two groups quarreled and the Nogais withdrew. The Tartars withdrew with their booty and the Russians chose not to follow.

In 1506  Vasili III of Russia, who had just come to the throne, sent two armies against Kazan.  One army went down the Volga. On 22 May they attacked, not waiting for the second army.  The Tartars cut off them off from their ships and defeated them.  On 22 June the second army unexpectedly appeared and made a great slaughter.  The Russians fell to looting, the Tartars counterattacked and most of the Russians were killed. (?)

In March 1507 Mohammad sent an ambassador to Moscow offering to give up the prisoners and make peace.  Vasili, being more concerned with Lithuania, accepted. The treaty was signed on September 8 in Moscow and December 23 in Kazan.  Early in the following year the captives were released except for those who had already been sold to Crimea or central Asia.

References
Henry Hoyle Howorth, History of the Mongols, 1880, Part 2, pp 378–385

Russo-Kazan Wars